The 2011 Leinster Senior Football Championship Final was the last football match of the 2010 Leinster Senior Football Championship, played between Dublin and Wexford on 10 July 2011 in Croke Park, Dublin. Dublin were bidding for their sixth Leinster Championship in seven years while Wexford were bidding for their first Provincial Championship title since 1945.

Dublin won the match 2-12 to 1-12. It was the 50th time the county had won the Leinster Senior Football Championship.

Route to the final
Preliminary Round: Wexford 2-16 Offaly 0-8; Dublin (BYE)
Quarter-Finals: Dublin 1-16 Laois 0-11; Wexford 1-24 Westmeath 0-15 
Semi-Finals: Dublin 1-12 Kildare 1-11; Wexford 4-12 Carlow 0-10

Match details

References

Leinster Senior Football Championship Final
Leinster Senior Football Championship Finals
Dublin county football team matches
Wexford county football team matches